John Wayne Murdoch is an American professional wrestler, and is best known for his time in IWA Mid-South (IWA) and ICW No Holds Barred, where he is a former ICW No Holds Barred American Deathmatch Champion, and Game Changer Wrestling where he is a former two-time GCW Tag Team Champion alongside Reed Bentley and Alex Colon, and is a former GCW Ultraviolent Champion.
He also won the 2020 IWTV Independent Wrestler of the Year.

Professional wrestling career

Independent circuit (2003–present)
Murdoch wrestled most of his career in hardcore matches, sticking to the gimmick of an extreme wrestler. He competed in the CZW Tournament of Death 18 of Combat Zone Wrestling, where he got defeated by Jimmy Lloyd in a Shattered Dreams Panes Of Glass Death Match on June 22, 2019. He also competed in the CZW Tournament of Death 16, where he fell short to Jimmy Havoc and Rickey Shane Page in a Pain in the Glass Match of a first-round on June 10, 2017. At CZW Down With The Sickness 2016 on September 10, Murdoch competed in a eight-man tag team match where he teamed up with Dale Patricks, Reed Bentley and Josh Crane as Team IWA Mid-South, falling short to The Nation Of Intoxication (Conor Claxton, Danny Havoc, Devon Moore and Lucky 13). Murdoch also competed for Full Impact Pro (FIP), making two appearances at FIP Fallout 2015 Tag Team Tournament, one of them on October 23, where he teamed up with Reed Bentley and Trik Davis to defeat Team Outlaw Wrestling (Bull Bronson, Devin Cutter and Mason Cutter) in a six-man tag team match of a first-round, and on October 24, teaming up with the same partners, falling short to The Viking War Party (Frank Wyatt, The American Viking and The Little Viking) in a second-round match. At Blackcraft No Apologies, an event promoted by Blackcraft Wrestling on April 5, 2019, Mudroch participated in a 28-man battle royal where he competed against other superstars such as the winner Zicky Dice, Mance Warner, Swoggle and former ECW wrestler Justin Credible.

IWA Mid-South (2008–Present)
Murdoch is known for his long-time tenure with IWA Mid-South, where he won the IWA Mid-South Heavyweight Championship for the first time at the promotion's 19th Anniversary Show from October 9, 2015, by defeating Shane Mercer. At IWA Mid-South A Labor Of Love on August 31, 2018, Murdoch fell short to Aaron Williams and Michael Elgin in a three-way match for the IWA Mid-South Heavyweight Championship. He competed at IWTV Family Reunion 2021 Part 1 event from April 8, 2021, where he defeated Jake Crist to win the IWA Mid-South Heavyweight Championship for the sixth time. However, he later vacated the title on April 15, at IWA Mid-South Spring Fever 2021, after he won the IWA Mid-South Tag Team Championship by teaming up with Jake Crist, with whom he was in a feud and defeating The PD Express (Logan James and Tyler Matrix).

Championships and accomplishments
Evolution Pro Wrestling
EPW Openweight Championship (1 time)
Game Changer Wrestling
GCW Ultraviolent Championship (1 time)
GCW Tag Team Championship (2 times) - with Reed Bentley (1) and Alex Colon (1)
GCW Nick Gage Invitational 7 Tournament winner
Horror Slam Wrestling
Horror Slam Deathmatch Championship (1 time, current)
ICW No Holds Barred
ICW American Deathmatch Championship (1 time)
IWA Mid-South
IWA Mid-South Heavyweight Championship (6 times)
IWA Mid-South Tag Team Championship (2 times, current) - with Reed Bentley (1) and Jake Crist (1)
Vic Philpott Memorial Hybrid Cup (2021)
National Wrestling Alliance
NWA Mid-America Tag Team Championship (2 times) - with Dante
Paradigm Pro Wrestling
PPW Tag Team Championship (2 times, current) - with Reed Bentley
Primos Pro Wrestling
Slave to the Deathmatch 12 (2021)
Pro Wrestling Illustrated
Ranked No. 301 of the top 500 singles wrestlers in the PWI 500 in 2021
Pro Wrestling Trainwreck
Southern Sickness Cup (2021)
United States Wrestling Organization
 USWO Heavyweight Championship (2 times)
 USWO Light Heavyweight Championship (1 time)
 USWO Music City Championship (3 times)
 USWO Tag Team Championship (6 times) - with LT Falk (1), The New York Gangster (1) and Josh Crow (4)
Unsanctioned Pro
Unsanctioned Pro Tag Team Championship (1 time, current) - with Reed Bentley
Vicious Outcast Wrestling
VOW Anarchy Championship (1 time)

References

External links 
 
 
 

1988 births
American male professional wrestlers
Living people